Namco Super Wars (ナムコスーパーウォーズ) is a tactical role-playing game developed by Namco and published by Bandai for the Wonderswan Color.  It is a crossover game, featuring characters from several classic Namco titles. This game is one of a few games jointly worked on by Bandai and Namco before their merger into Bandai Namco Holdings in 2005.

Gameplay
The game is played on a square grid, on which both the player's and computer's units are placed. Each side takes turns moving and making actions with their units. Every character has a variety of attacks and special moves that can be selected when performing an action. Some of these consume Spirit Points, which slowly regenerate each turn. The game is divided into stages. Between each stage, the player is able to visit a shop and prepare his units before starting the next stage. Unlike most RPGs, characters do not gain levels for directly defeating opponents. Instead, completion of a map will reward the players with a number of level ups, which they can then distribute among their units as they wish.

Characters
As a crossover game, Namco Super Wars includes characters from a number of previous Namco games.  The games represented are the following:

Valkyrie no Bōken: Toki no Kagi Densetsu / Valkyrie no Densetsu
Dragon Buster / Dragon Valor
Dragon Spirit
The Tower of Druaga
Genpei Tōma Den
Mappy
Dig Dug
Phelios
Wonder Momo
Bravoman
Family Stadium

Legacy
Although no sequel was ever planned, a later crossover game, Namco X Capcom was another tactical role playing game that used many of the same characters.

External links
 Namco Super Wars homepage at the Bandai website 

2002 video games
Crossover role-playing video games
WonderSwan Color games
Tactical role-playing video games
Video games developed in Japan
Japan-exclusive video games
Namco games